The Old Mulkey Meetinghouse, also known as Mill Creek Baptist Church, is a historic church built in 1804 in Tompkinsville, Kentucky.  It was added to the National Register of Historic Places in 1973. It is part of the Old Mulkey Meetinghouse State Historic Site.

It is "significant both as one of Kentucky's earliest log churches and for its unusual construction features - its twelve-sided construction and its lack of a fireplace."

References

External links
Old Mulkey Meeting House Website

Baptist churches in Kentucky
Churches on the National Register of Historic Places in Kentucky
Churches completed in 1804
National Register of Historic Places in Monroe County, Kentucky
1804 establishments in Kentucky
Log buildings and structures on the National Register of Historic Places in Kentucky
Tompkinsville, Kentucky